Boile Run (also known as Boyle Run) is a tributary of the Susquehanna River in Northumberland County, Pennsylvania, in the United States. The stream is not designated as an impaired waterbody and is a relatively small stream. There was a mill on Boile Run in the second half of the 1800s and several bridges have been built over the stream. Its watershed is designated as a Warmwater Fishery and a Migratory Fishery.

Course

Boile Run begins in a pond or small lake at the base of Little Mountain in Lower Augusta Township. It flows west-northwest into a valley for several tenths of a mile and passes through another pond or small lake before turning west-southwest for more than a mile, receiving two unnamed tributaries from the right. The stream then turns west for a short distance before receiving an unnamed tributary from the left and turning southwest. It flows in this direction for more than a mile, receiving another unnamed tributary from the right along the way, before meandering west, receiving another unnamed tributary from the left, and then turning south. It then leaves its valley, crosses Pennsylvania Route 147 and a railroad, and reaches its confluence with the Susquehanna River.

Boile Run joins the Susquehanna River  upriver of its mouth.

Hydrology
Boile Run is not designated as an impaired waterbody. At least one person has a National Pollutant Discharge Elimination System to discharge sewage into an unnamed tributary of the stream from a single residence.

The peak annual discharge of Boile Run at its mouth has a 10 percent chance of reaching . It has a 2 percent chance of reaching  and a 1 percent chance of reaching .

Geography and geology

Boile Run is a small stream.

Watershed
The stream is entirely within the United States Geological Survey quadrangle of Sunbury. Its designated use is for aquatic life.

Boile Run is one of two major creeks in Lower Augusta Township, the other being Hallowing Run.

Flooding occurred on Boile Run in June 1972.

History
Boile Run was entered into the Geographic Names Information System on August 2, 1979. Its identifier in the Geographic Names Information System is 1169949. The stream is also known as Boyle Run, a name which appears on a 1953 United States Geological Survey map.

The original spelling of the stream's name was "Boile Run"; this was corrupted to "Boyle Run" on some maps, though the earlier name had appeared on maps as far back as 1874. In 1965, the USGS recommended that the name "Boile Run" be formally adopted. Many of the early settlers in the valley of Boile Run were of Scotch-Irish descent. John Snyder built a mill on the stream in 1858 and operated it until it burned down in 1880.

A bridge carrying State Route 4022 over Boile Run was slated for replacement in 2015.

Biology
The drainage basin of Boile Run is designated as a Warmwater Fishery and a Migratory Fishery.

See also
 Penns Creek, next tributary of the Susquehanna River going downriver
 Hallowing Run, next tributary of the Susquehanna River going upriver
 List of rivers of Pennsylvania

References

Rivers of Northumberland County, Pennsylvania
Tributaries of the Susquehanna River
Rivers of Pennsylvania